Nachum Dershowitz is an Israeli computer scientist, known e.g. for the Dershowitz–Manna ordering and the multiset path ordering used to prove termination of term rewrite systems.

He obtained his B.Sc. summa cum laude in 1974 in Computer Science–Applied Mathematics from Bar-Ilan University, and his Ph.D. in 1979 in Applied Mathematics from the Weizmann Institute of Science.
From 1978, he worked at the Department of Computer Science of the University of Illinois at Urbana-Champaign, until he became a full professor of the Tel Aviv University (School of Computer Science) in 1998. 
He was a guest researcher at Weizmann Institute, INRIA, ENS Cachan, Microsoft Research, and the universities of Stanford, Paris, Jerusalem, Chicago, and Beijing. He received the Herbrand Award for Distinguished Contributions to Automatic Reasoning in 2011.

He has co-authored the standard text on calendar algorithms, Calendrical Calculations, with Edward Reingold.  An implementation of the algorithm in Common Lisp is put into the public domain, and is also distributed with the book.

See also
 New Moon
 Lunisolar calendar

Selected publications

 
 
 
 
 
 
 
 
 
 
 
 
 
 
 
 
 
 
 
 Dershowitz, Nachum and Reingold, Edward M., Calendrical Calculations, Cambridge University Press, 1997
 
 
 
 
 
 Dershowitz, Nachum 2005. The Four Sons of Penrose, in Proceedings of the Eleventh Conference on Logic for Programming, Artificial Intelligence, and Reasoning (LPAR; Jamaica), G. Sutcliffe and A. Voronkov, eds., Lecture Notes in Computer Science, vol. 3835, Springer-Verlag, Berlin, pp. 125–138.

References

External links
 Publications at DBLP
 Home page
 Nachum Dershowitz at the Mathematics Genealogy Project
 Video "The Church-Turing Thesis", Nachum Dershowitz on Sixth Israel CS Theory Day, Mar 13, 2013

Israeli computer scientists
Theoretical computer scientists
Living people
Year of birth missing (living people)